The Granbury micropolitan statistical area, as defined by the United States Census Bureau, was an area consisting of two counties in North Central Texas, anchored by the city of Granbury. In 2013, though, the Office of Management and Budget reclassified the area as a part of the Fort Worth-Arlington metropolititan division within the Dallas-Fort Worth-Arlington metropolitan area.

As of the 2000 census, the area had a population of 47,909 (a July 1, 2009, estimate placed the population at 59,493).

Counties
Hood
Somervell

Communities
Incorporated places
Brazos Bend
Cresson (partial)
DeCordova
Granbury (Principal city)
Glen Rose
Lipan
Tolar
Census-designated places
Oak Trail Shores
Pecan Plantation
Unincorporated places
Acton
Glass
Nemo
Paluxy
Rainbow
Thorp Spring (founding location, 1873, of AddRan Male & Female College, now Texas Christian University)

Demographics
As of the census of 2000,  47,909 people, 18,614 households, and 13,939 families were residing within the area. Its racial makeup was 94.41% White, 0.32% African American, 0.81% Native American, 0.34% )|Asian or Pacific Islander]], 2.79% from other races, and 1.34% from two or more races. Hispanics or Latinos of any race were 8.12% of the population.

The median income for a household in the area was $41,536, and for a family was $48,285. Males had a median income of $35,563 versus $23,552 for females. The per capita income for the μSA was $20,314.

Major highways
 U.S. Highway 67
 U.S. Highway 377
 State Highway 144

Education
These school districts serve the Granbury micropolitan area:
Bluff Dale ISD (mostly in Erath County)
Glen Rose ISD
Godley ISD (mostly in Johnson County, small portion in Tarrant County)
Granbury ISD (small portion in Johnson, Parker counties)
Lipan ISD (small portion in Erath, Palo Pinto, and Parker counties)
Three Way ISD (mostly in Erath County)
Tolar ISD
Walnut Springs ISD (mostly in Bosque County)

See also
Texas census statistical areas
List of Texas metropolitan areas
List of cities in Texas

References

 
Geography of Hood County, Texas
Geography of Somervell County, Texas